David James Elliott (born September 21, 1960) is a Canadian actor who was the star of the series JAG, playing lead character Harmon Rabb Jr. from 1995 to 2005.

Early life
Elliott was born David William Smith on September 21, 1960, in Milton, Ontario, Canada, the son of Patricia Smith (née Farrow), an office manager, and Arnold Smith, a heating and plumbing wholesale contractor. He was born the second of three boys. During his teenaged years, he was part of a band, quitting Milton District High School in his final year to pursue his dream of becoming a rock star. However, at age 19, he realized this would not happen and returned to finish high school.

After graduating from high school, he attended Ryerson University in Toronto, graduating in 1982. He joined the Stratford Shakespearean Festival in Ontario as a member of its Young Company.

Career
Subsequently moving to Los Angeles, he took the stage name David James Elliott, having found an actor was already named David Smith. He appeared in the film Police Academy 3: Back in Training in 1986, and subsequently in the television series Street Legal, Knots Landing as Bill Nolan, and in 1993's The Untouchables as Agent Paul Robbins. The following year, Elliott landed a recurring role on the hit series Melrose Place, playing Terry Parsons, and a guest appearance in an episode of Seinfeld as "Carl" the anti-abortion furniture mover.

In 1995, Elliott landed the role he would hold for 10 years, the role of naval aviator-turned JAG lawyer Harmon Rabb, Jr. in the NBC/CBS television drama JAG. His tenure on JAG ended in 2005 with the series finale.

In 1996, Elliott starred in the made-for-cable movie Holiday Affair with Cynthia Gibb. This is a remake of the 1949 classic Holiday Affair which starred Robert Mitchum and Janet Leigh. In 2005, Elliott starred in a Canadian television movie The Man Who Lost Himself, which was based on the true story of Terry Evanshen, a Canadian football player who was in a car accident and lost his memory due to severe head injuries. Nanci Chambers also appeared in this movie as a doctor. In October 2006, Elliott joined the cast of legal drama Close to Home (2005–2007) as Chief Deputy Prosecutor James Conlon. During 2008, he had a recurring role in the Canadian series The Guard. He starred in Sci Fi Channel's four-hour miniseries, Knights of Bloodsteel (2009). Elliott was cast as an Internet millionaire in Terror Trap, directed by Dan Garcia. Elliott also starred in Dad's Home (2010), a widowed advertising executive who loses his job and becomes a stay-at-home dad for his two children.

On March 19, 2010, Elliott replaced Neal McDonough as the male lead in the television series Scoundrels. In 2010, Elliott was cast as FBI Agent Russ Josephson on CSI: NY, a recurring role as Detective Jo Danville's (Sela Ward) ex-husband,  a role which he first portrayed in January 2011.

In 2012, Elliott also co-starred as Ripp Cockburn, the husband of Kristin Chenoweth's character Carlene, on ABC's comedy-drama series GCB. In 2014, Elliott appeared in Mad Men (season 7) as Dave Wooster. In 2015, Elliott guest starred in the TV drama Scorpion.

In 2015, Elliott played actor John Wayne in the film Trumbo.

On March 29, 2019, CBS announced Elliott would be reprising his JAG role of Harmon Rabb, Jr. for a multi-episode arc in the tenth season of NCIS: Los Angeles.

Personal life
He married actress Nanci Chambers in 1992. She also appeared in JAG as the ambitious Lt. Loren Singer. They have a daughter, Stephanie Elliott (b. 1993) and a son, Wyatt Elliott.

Filmography

Film

Television

Awards
 TV Guide Award [2000] "Favorite Male Actor in a Drama".

References

External links
 
 Milton: David James Elliott

1960 births
Canadian expatriate male actors in the United States
Canadian male film actors
Canadian male television actors
Canadian male voice actors
Canadian people of British descent
Living people
Male actors from Ontario
People from Milton, Ontario
Toronto Metropolitan University alumni